Hababeh or Hobbabeh may refer to:
 Hababeh-ye Olya
 Hababeh-ye Sofla
 Hababeh-ye Vosta